Edward Baron (by 1464–?1514), of Kingston upon Hull, Yorkshire, was an English politician.

He was MP for Kingston upon Hull in 1512.

References

15th-century births
1514 deaths
Politicians from Kingston upon Hull
English MPs 1512–1514